The Stony Mountain Formation is a stratigraphical unit of Ashgill age in the Western Canadian Sedimentary Basin.

It takes the name from the community Stony Mountain, Manitoba, and was first described in the town quarry by D.B. Dowling in 1900.

Lithology

Subdivisions

The Stony Mountain Formation is divided in the following sub-units:

South (Williston Basin)
Penitentiary Member: argillaceous dolomite
Gunn Member: interbedded calcareous shale and fossiliferous limestone
North
Gunton Member: crystalline dolomite
Lower Stony Mountain: argillaceous dolomite

Distribution
The Stony Mountain Formation occurs throughout the Williston Basin.

Relationship to other units

The Stony Mountain Formation is slightly unconformably overlain by the Stonewall Formation and sharply overlays the Red River Formation or the Herald Formation.

References

Stratigraphy of Saskatchewan
Stratigraphy of Manitoba
Ordovician geology of North Dakota